USS DeLong (DD-129) was a  built for the United States Navy during World War I.

Description
The Wickes class was an improved and faster version of the preceding . Two different designs were prepared to the same specification that mainly differed in the turbines and boilers used. The ships built to the Bethlehem Steel design, built in the Fore River and Union Iron Works shipyards, mostly used Yarrow boilers that deteriorated badly during service and were mostly scrapped during the 1930s. They had a crew of 6 officers and 108 enlisted men.

Performance differed radically between the ships of the class, often due to poor workmanship. The Wickes class was powered by two steam turbines, each driving one propeller shaft, using steam provided by four water-tube boilers.

The ships were armed with four 4-inch (102 mm) guns in single mounts and were fitted with two  1-pounder guns for anti-aircraft defense. Their primary weapon, though, was their torpedo battery of a dozen 21 inch (533 mm) torpedo tubes in four triple mounts. In many ships a shortage of 1-pounders caused them to be replaced by 3-inch (76 mm) anti-aircraft (AA) guns. They also carried a pair of depth charge rails. A "Y-gun" depth charge thrower was added to many ships.

Construction and career
DeLong, named for Lieutenant Commander George W. DeLong (1844–1881), an Arctic explorer, was launched 29 October 1918 by New York Shipbuilding Corporation, Camden, New Jersey; sponsored by Miss E. DeL. Mills, granddaughter of Lt. Cmdr. DeLong; and commissioned 20 September 1919. DeLong sailed from New York 3 November 1919, and after joining in exercises at Guantanamo Bay, and patrolling off Honduras arrived at San Diego 24 December. She sailed in maneuvers and torpedo practice off Coronado Roads until placed in reserve 20 June 1920. After extended overhaul at Mare Island Navy Yard, she returned to San Diego 26 June 1921 and began operating from that port 21 October with 50 percent of her complement. On 1 December 1921 she went aground in a heavy fog at Half Moon Bay. A tug and two destroyers, Badger (DD-126) and Ballard (DD-267), stood by to assist. On 17 December she was salvaged and towed to Mare Island Navy Yard. DeLong was decommissioned 18 March 1922 and her hulk sold 25 September 1922.

Notes

References

External links
navsource.org: USS DeLong
hazegray.org: USS DeLong

 

Wickes-class destroyers
Ships built by New York Shipbuilding Corporation
1918 ships
Maritime incidents in 1921
Shipwrecks of the California coast